Uff da! (sometimes also spelled oof-da, oofda, oofala, oof-dah, oofdah, huffda, uff-da, uffda, uff-dah, ufda, or uf daa) is a Scandinavian exclamation or interjection used to express dismay, typically upon hearing bad news. Of Norwegian origin, the phrase was brought by Scandinavian Americans to the Upper Midwest, New England, and Pacific Northwest regions of the United States during the 19th century, where its meaning was broadened to express also surprise, astonishment, exhaustion, or relief.

Danish and Norwegian usage
The word is an onomatopoeia corresponding to English oof, Dutch  and German . Uff is a Swedish word with the same meaning as the Norwegian word, it is documented in writing from 1770.

North American usage
Uff da is a marker of Scandinavian heritage, predominantly heard in the upper Midwest, which has a significant population with Scandinavian roots. It also is used throughout the Pacific Northwest, particularly in the Washington cities of Ballard and Stanwood. Its variety of meanings let it substitute for common obscenities.
 Within Scandinavian-American culture, uff da frequently translates to "I am overwhelmed", somewhat similar to the Yiddish phrase oy vey.

It has also been applied to places and events, such as:

 Uff-Da Airport, located in Stoughton, Wisconsin.
 Uffda Fest!, an annual event held in Spring Grove, Minnesota.
 Uff Da Days, an annual event held in Ostrander, Minnesota.
 Uffda Day Fall Festival, an annual event held in Rutland, North Dakota.
 The Uff-Da Shoppe, located in Stanwood, Washington.

See also
Culture of Minnesota
Culture of the Upper Peninsula of Michigan
Culture of Wisconsin
List of English words of Norwegian origin

References

Further reading

Allen, Harold B. (1973). The Linguistic Atlas of the Upper Midwest, Volume 1, (Minneapolis: University of Minnesota Press), . OCLC 658192.
Haugen, Einar (1957) Beginning Norwegian: a grammar and reader (George G.Harrap & Co Ltd) 
Lovoll, Odd S. (1998) The Promise Fulfilled: A Portrait of Norwegian Americans Today (Minneapolis: University of Minnesota Press) 
Mohr, Howard (1987) How to talk Minnesotan : a visitor's guide (New York, NY: Penguin Books)

External links
Kinnes, Tormod. "Uff Da: Norwegian-American expressivity"
"Uff da!" Archived from lawzone.com/half-nor/uffda.htm
"Rock Bend Folk Festival 2007 – Al Batt". YouTube.

English-language slang
Norwegian-American culture
Norwegian words and phrases
Norwegian migration to North America